Glitter and Doom Live is a live album by Tom Waits, by the ANTI- label on November 23, 2009. The songs were recorded during the Glitter and Doom Tour of the US and Europe in the summer of 2008.

An announcement from the official site said:

Prior to release, ANTI- made the first eight tracks available for free download.

Track listing
Disc1

Disc 2

Reception

The album was released to mostly positive reviews. Drowned in Sound gave the album 8/10.

Personnel
 Tom Waits – vocals, guitar
 Seth Ford-Young – upright bass, bass guitar
 Vincent Henry – woodwinds and harmonica
 Omar Torrez – guitar, banjo
 Casey Waits – percussion
 Sullivan Waits – clarinet
 Patrick Warren – keyboard

Chart positions

References

External links
 ANTI.com information page
 Tom Waits Official site

2009 live albums
Spoken word albums by American artists
Tom Waits live albums
Anti- (record label) live albums
Epitaph Records live albums